DCD Group Ltd. (formerly DCD-Dorbyl Ltd.) is a South African manufacturer and engineering company focusing on the rail, mining, energy, defence, and marine sectors. It is based in Vereeniging, South Africa.

DCD Group specializes in engineering projects, including rail and military vehicle engineering, roller manufacturing, marine engineering, and mine engineering.

DCD Protected Mobility manufactures the Husky VMMD, a counter-IED MRAP currently in use with the United States Army, the United States Marine Corps, and the South African Defence Force.

DCD Group was originally established in 1946 as DCD-Dorbyl Ltd., a merger of Dorman Long and Vanderbijl Engineering Corporation. It rebranded in 2012 as DCD Group Ltd.

In February 2010, Westinghouse and DCD-Dorbyl announced cooperation on creating a plant for building modules for AP1000 reactors.

The current CEO of DCD Group is Digby Glover.

References

External links
 Official website

Engineering companies of South Africa
Defence companies of South Africa
Companies based in Gauteng
Vereeniging